The 2004 Iranian seizure of Royal Navy personnel took place in the Shatt al-Arab (Arvand Rud in Persian) waterway on 21 June. Six Royal Marines and two Royal Navy sailors were captured.
The British servicemen were seized while training Iraqi river patrol personnel after Iran said they had strayed to the Iranian side of the waterway. They were threatened with legal action initially but released three days later following diplomatic discussions between Jack Straw, then British Foreign Secretary, and Kamal Kharazi, then Iranian Minister of Foreign Affairs. The weapons and boats of the British personnel were confiscated and have not been returned.

They were released unharmed three days later, on 24 June, after the British and Iranian governments agreed there had been a misunderstanding. Their equipment was not returned and a rigid inflatable boat (RIB) was put on display in a museum in Tehran. During their detention, according to former detainee Marine Scott Fallon, they endured a mock execution in which they were marched into the desert and made to stand blindfolded in front of a ditch while their captors cocked their weapons. They also appeared blindfolded on Iranian TV, where they were forced to apologise for their "mistake". The Royal Navy boats were operating close to the northern coast of the Persian Gulf in the mouth of the Shatt al-Arab waterway which divides southern Iran and Iraq. The weather was bad causing negligible visibility which may have contributed to a potential crossing of the Iranian border by the Royal Navy. After the crew were returned and events analysed the British government affirmed its belief that the personnel were actually still in Iraqi waters, however they consigned the incident to a misunderstanding and requested the return of the equipment. In 2015, an FOIA request released a redacted report.

See also
 2007 Iranian seizure of Royal Navy personnel, in which 15 personnel were seized and held for 12 days

References

Seizure of Royal Navy personnel
Iranian seizure of Royal Navy personnel
International maritime incidents
Diplomatic incidents
Maritime incidents in 2004
Iranian Seizure of Royal Navy Personnel, 2004
Iran–United Kingdom military relations
21st-century history of the Royal Navy
Battles and conflicts without fatalities
June 2004 events in Asia